Peter Johannes Bakker (born 4 August 1934) is a rower who represented the Netherlands. He competed at the 1960 Summer Olympics in Rome with the men's double sculls where they came fifth.

References

1934 births
Living people
Dutch male rowers
Olympic rowers of the Netherlands
Rowers at the 1960 Summer Olympics
Sportspeople from Rotterdam
European Rowing Championships medalists
20th-century Dutch people
21st-century Dutch people